The Five Safes is a framework for helping make decisions about making effective use of data which is confidential or sensitive. It is mainly used to describe or design research access to statistical data held by government agencies, and by data archives such as the UK Data Service.

Two of the Five Safes refer to statistical disclosure control, and so the Five Safes is usually used to contrast statistical and non-statistical controls when comparing data management options.

Concept 
The Five Safes proposes that data management decisions be considered as solving problems in five 'dimensions': projects, people, settings, data and outputs. The combination of the controls leads to 'safe use'. These are most commonly expressed as questions, for example:

These dimensions are scales, not limits. That is, solutions can have a mix of more or fewer controls in each dimension, but the overall aim of 'safe use' independent of the particular mix. For example, a public use file available for open download cannot control who uses it, where or for what purpose, and so all the control (protection) must be in the data itself. In contrast, a file which is only accessed through a secure environment with certified users can contain very sensitive information: the non-statistical controls allow the data to be 'unsafe'. One academic likened the process to a graphic equalizer, where bass and treble can be combined independently to produce a sound the listener likes.

There is no 'order' to the Five Safes, in that one is necessarily more important than the others. However, Ritchie argued that the 'managerial' controls (projects, people, setting) should be addressed before the 'statistical' controls (data, output).

The Five Safes concept is associated with other topics which developed from the same programme at ONS, although these are not necessarily implemented. Safe people is associated with 'active researcher management', while safe outputs is linked with principles-based output statistical disclosure control.

The Five Safes is a positive framework, describing what is and is not. The EDRU ('evidence-based, default-open, risk-managed, user-centred') attitudinal model is sometimes used to give a normative context

The 'data access spectrum' 
From 2003 the Five Safes was also represented in a simpler form as a 'Data Access Spectrum'.The non-data controls (project, people, setting, outputs) tend to work together, in that organisations often see these as a complementary set of restrictions on access. These can then be contrasted with choices about data anonymisation to present a linear representation of data access options. This presentation is consistent with the idea of 'data as a residual', as well as data protection laws of the time which often characterised data simply as anonymous or not anonymous.

A similar idea had already been developed independently in 2001 by Chuck Humphrey of the Canadian RDC network, the 'continuum of access'. More recently, The Open Data Institute has developed a 'Data Spectrum toolkit' which includes industry-specific examples.

History and terminology 
The Five Safes was devised in the winter of 2002/2003 by Felix Ritchie at the UK Office for National Statistics (ONS) to describe its secure remote-access Virtual Microdata Laboratory (VML). It was described at this time as the 'VML Security Model'. This was adopted by the NORC data enclave, and more widely in the US, as the 'portfolio model' (although this is now also used to refer to a slightly different legal/statistical/educational breakdown). In 2012 the framework as was still being referred to as the 'VML security model', but its increasing use among non-UK organisations led to the adoption of the more general and informative phrase 'Five Safes'.

The original framework only had four safes (projects, people, settings and outputs): the framework was used to describe highly detailed data access through a secure environment, and so the 'data' dimension was irrelevant. From 2007 onwards, 'safe data' was included as the framework was used to a describe a wider range of ONS activities. As the US version was based upon the 2005 specification, some US iterations uses have the original four dimensions (eg).

Some discussions, such as the OECD, use the term 'secure' instead 'safe'. However, the use of both these terms can cause presentational problems: less control in a particular dimension could be seen to imply 'unsafe users' or 'insecure settings', for example, which distracts from the main message. Hence, the Australian government uses the term "five data sharing principles".

The 'Anonymisation Decision-Making Framework' uses a framework based on the Five Safes but relabelling "projects", "people", and "settings" as "governance", "agency" and "infrastructure", respectively; "Output" is omitted, and "safe use" becomes "functional anonymisation". There is no reference to the Five Safes or any associated literature. The Australian version was required to include references to the Five Safes, and presented it as an alternative without comment.

Application 
The framework has had three uses: pedagogical, descriptive, and design. The latter is a relatively recent development.

Pedagogy 
The first significant use of the framework, other than internal administrative use, was to structure researcher training courses at the UK Office for National Statistics from 2003. UK Data Archive, Administrative Data Research Network, Eurostat, Statistics New Zealand, the Mexican National Institute of Statistics and Geography, NORC, Statistics Canada and the Australian Bureau of Statistics, amongst others, have also used this framework. Most of these courses are for researchers using restricted-access facilities; the Eurostat courses are unusual in that they are designed for all users of sensitive data.

Description 
The framework is often used to describe existing data access solutions (e.g. UK HMRC Data Lab, UK Data Service, Statistics New Zealand) or planned/conceptualised ones (e.g. Eurostat in 2011). An early use was to help identify areas where ONS' still had 'irreducible risks' in its provision of secure remote access.

The framework is mostly used for confidential social science data. To date it appears to have made little impact on medical research planning, although it is now included in the revised guidelines on implementing HIPAA regulations in the US, and by Cancer Research UK and the Health Foundation in the UK. It has also been used to describe a security model for the Scottish Health Informatics Programme.

Design 
In general the Five Safes has been used to describe solutions post-factum, and to explain/justify choices made, but an increasing number of organisations have used the framework to design data access solutions. For example, the Hellenic Statistical Agency developed a data strategy built around the Five Safes in 2016; the UK Health Foundation used the Five Safes to design its data management and training programmes. Use in the private sector is less common but  some organisations have incorporated the Five Safes into consulting services.

The major design use is in Australia: both the Australian Bureau of Statistics and the Australian Department of Social Service used the Five Safes as an ex ante design tool.  In 2017 the Australian Productivity Commission recommended adopting a version of the framework to support cross-government data sharing and re-use. This is currently undergoing consultation with draft legislation expected in 2020.

In 2015 the UK Data Service organized a workshop to encourage data users from the academic and private sectors to think about how to manage confidential research data, using the Five Safes to demonstrate alternative options and best practice.

Two laws have incorporated the Fives Safes: explicitly in the South Australian Public Sector (Data Sharing) Act 2016, implicitly in the research provisions of the Digital Economy Act.

Public engagement 
The UK Data Service has produced a blog and video for the general public about the use of Five Safes in re-using administrative data. Statistics New Zealand produced a non-technical description, as did ONS for Data Privacy Day 2017. The Australian Federal Government has produced several videos on data sharing, including the Data Sharing Principles.

References

External links 
 fivesafes.org- original concept website
 aihw.gov.au/.../the-five-safes-framework - example as implemented by Australian Institute of Health and Welfare
 ukdataservice.ac.uk/.../what-is-the-five-safes-framework - example as implemented by UK Data Service

Confidentiality
Data management
Disclosure
Human subject research
National statistical services
Privacy